Waldo Bennett "Ben" Rose is a former member of the Ohio House of Representatives, serving from 1973 to 1986. Presently, he is the assistant director of the Ohio Department of Health.

Footnotes

Living people
Republican Party members of the Ohio House of Representatives
Year of birth missing (living people)